Peoria Lake is a section of the Illinois River between Peoria in Peoria County, Illinois and East Peoria in Tazewell County, Illinois.  The oldest section of Peoria, the largest city on the river, lies at its shores.

The lake is formed by a broadening of the Illinois River, and was first mentioned by the Louis Joliet and Jacques Marquette expedition in 1674. Several important Native American settlements were located close to it, like the main villages of the Kickapoo and Potawatomi tribes.  During early European colonization, the lake was called Pimitéoui ("Fat Lake").  And a French Fort on its banks was called Fort Pimitéoui (1691), later known as Old Fort Peoria.

From a modern perspective, the lake runs from just south of the McClugage Bridge (US 24/US 150/War Memorial Drive) to the Murray Baker Bridge (Interstate 74). The larger Upper Peoria Lake flows into the lake on its north side.

The lake is currently a regional tourist attraction and is used for practice of many watersports.  It is also the usual site for the City of Peoria's Fourth of July fireworks display.

See also
Upper Peoria Lake

External links
Peoria Lake Habitat Rehabilitation and Enhancement Project – by the United States Army Corps of Engineers

Lakes of Illinois
Bodies of water of Peoria County, Illinois
Bodies of water of Tazewell County, Illinois
Tourist attractions in Peoria County, Illinois
Tourist attractions in Tazewell County, Illinois
Illinois River
Tourist attractions in Peoria, Illinois